Fali comprises two languages spoken in northern Cameroon. Included in Greenberg's Adamawa languages (as group G11), it was excluded from that family by Boyd (1989). Roger Blench suspects it may represent one of the earlier lineages to have branched off the Atlantic–Congo stock.

Varieties
According to Ethnologue 16, the two branches of Fali are "different," but it is not clear how distinct they are. Blench apparently treats them as half a dozen languages in two branches. South Fali has 20,000 speakers, with several dialects. North Fali, with 16,000 speakers, also has several dialects; North Fali speakers were "rapidly" shifting to Adamawa Fulfulde by 1982.

North Fali
 Dourbeye (Fali-Dourbeye)
 Bossum (Fali-Bossum)
 Bvəri (Fali du Peske-Bori)
South Fali
 Kaang (Fali Kangou)
 Bele (Fali-Bele)
 Fali-Tinguélin

The Nimbari language used to be spoken in the southern Fali area, but Nimbari people now speak Fali Kangou.

See also
List of Proto-Fali reconstructions (Wiktionary)

References

Further reading
Roger Blench, 2004. List of Adamawa languages (ms)
Sweetman, Gary. 1981. A comparative study of Fali dialects. Yaoundé: SIL.

Atlantic–Congo languages
Languages of Cameroon